Damian Welch (born 28 July 1982 in Reading) is a Welsh qualified Rugby Union player who plays at lock for Cardiff Blues. He is represented Wales at Sevens in 2008-9.

Club career
Welch played for Westwood Wanderers until the age of 16.

After beginning his rugby career at Cardiff University he then went to represent Pontypridd, Cardiff and Cardiff Blues and the Scarlets.

References

1984 births
Living people
Cardiff Rugby players
English rugby union players
Exeter Chiefs players
Rugby union players from Reading, Berkshire
Scarlets players
Rugby union locks